The VIII South American Games (Spanish: Juegos Sudamericanos; Portuguese: Jogos Sul-Americanos) were a multi-sport event held from 9 to 19 November 2006 in Buenos Aires, Argentina, with some events taking place in Mar del Plata (canoeing, cycling, futsal, handball, roller sports, rowing, triathlon). An appraisal of the games and detailed medal lists were published
elsewhere,
emphasizing the results of the Argentinian teams.

The Games were organized by the South American Sports Organization (ODESUR), who awarded the Games to the city with 10 votes over the bids by previous hosts Cuenca, Ecuador (3 votes) and Lima, Peru (1 vote).

The Games were originally awarded to the first edition host La Paz, Bolivia, but this decision was retracted following domestic instability in Bolivia during 2005. This country did not participate in the subsequent selection process after ODESUR denied its request to reconsider the decision.

Torch lighter at the Estadio del Parque Roca was multiple Olympic medalist, windsurfer Carlos Espínola.

Venues

Buenos Aires

 CeNARD - Athletics, Weightlifting, Judo, Wrestling, Taekwondo, Field Hockey and Swimming.
 Club Atlético River Plate - Table Tennis.
 Federación Argentina de Boxeo - Boxing.
 Estadio Mary Terán de Weiss - Tennis.
 Gimnasia y Esgrima de Buenos Aires - Fencing.
 Tiro Federal - Shooting.
 Parque Polideportivo Roca - Archery
 Buenos Aires Yacht Club - Sailing.
 Club Atlético Vélez Sarsfield - Karate, Bocce.
 Club Ciudad de Buenos Aires - Gymnastics.
 San Lorenzo de Almagro - Artistic roller skating.
 Lake of the Autódromo Juan y Oscar Gálvez - Waterskiing.

Mar del Plata
 Polideportivo Islas Malvinas - Handball and Futsal.
 Laguna de los Padres - Canoeing and Rowing.
 Patinódromo Municipal - Inline speed skating.

Other areas
 Capilla del señor - Equestrian.
 Avellaneda - Bowling.
 Zarate - Open water swimming.

Medal Count

The medal count for these Games is tabulated below. This table is sorted by the number of gold medals earned by each country. The number of silver medals is taken into consideration next, and then the number of bronze medals.

Sports

  Archery
  Athletics†
  Badminton
  Baseball
  Boxing
  Canoeing

  Cycling
  Equestrian
  Fencing
  Field Hockey
  Football
  Gymnastics
  Handball

  Judo
  Softball
  Rowing
  Modern Pentathlon
  Sailing
  Shooting
  Swimming

  Table Tennis
  Taekwondo
  Tennis‡
  Triathlon
  Volleyball
  Weightlifting
  Wrestling

Notes
†: The competition was reserved to representatives aged under 23.

‡: The competition was reserved to junior representatives (U-20).

References

External links
 Buenos Aires selection ODESUR news page
 La Paz Games cancelled
 Official site
 All Results

 
South American Games
South American Games
South American Games
International sports competitions hosted by Argentina
Sports competitions in Buenos Aires
Multi-sport events in Argentina
South American Games
2000s in Buenos Aires
November 2006 sports events in South America